Janice Lawton is a Paralympic athlete from Great Britain competing mainly in category F33 shot put and discus events.

Janice Lawton competed in a World Record Sanctioned event in Nottingham 1993 and set three World Records in Shot Put, Discus throw and Javelin throw for F33/34. She competed in World Championships in Berlin 1994 winning Gold and World Record for Javelin Throw F34 and Silver for Shot Put and Discus throws in F34.

Janice has competed in two Paralympics and each time won a single silver medal.  Her first games were in 1996 where she won a silver medal in her only event, the shot put.  In the 2000 Summer Paralympics she competed in shot and discus winning the silver medal in the later.

References

Paralympic athletes of Great Britain
Athletes (track and field) at the 1996 Summer Paralympics
Athletes (track and field) at the 2000 Summer Paralympics
Paralympic silver medalists for Great Britain
Living people
Medalists at the 1996 Summer Paralympics
Medalists at the 2000 Summer Paralympics
Year of birth missing (living people)
Paralympic medalists in athletics (track and field)
British female javelin throwers
British female shot putters